Mehran Hatami is an Iranian basketball coach of the Iranian national team, which he coached at the 2017 FIBA Asia Cup. A former member of Team Melli in the Asian Games and FIBA Championships during the 1990's, Hatami succeeded Dirk Bauermann as head coach of the Iranian national team.

References

Iranian basketball coaches
Living people
Basketball players at the 1990 Asian Games
Basketball players at the 1998 Asian Games
Year of birth missing (living people)
Asian Games competitors for Iran